Royal-Dominique Fennell (born June 5, 1989) is a German-American Association football player who plays for SGV Freiberg as a defensive midfielder.

International career
Fennell was first called into United States Youth National Teams in late 2011 when United States U23 manager Caleb Porter was looking for answers to a shallow pool of U-23 defenders. Fennell participated in several camps and was called to the qualifying squad, but his club, which was in the throes of a promotion race, did not release him.

On 16 July 2019, TSG 1899 Hoffenheim announced that they had signed Fennell on a one-year contract, where he was going to play for the reserve team, 1899 Hoffenheim II.

References

External links
 
 
 

1989 births
Living people
American association football players
Association football defenders
United States men's under-23 international association football players
Stuttgarter Kickers II players
Stuttgarter Kickers players
Würzburger Kickers players
Hallescher FC players
VfR Aalen players
TSG 1899 Hoffenheim II players
3. Liga players
American emigrants to Germany
German people of African-American descent
American people of German descent
People from Göppingen
Sportspeople from Stuttgart (region)
Footballers from Baden-Württemberg
German footballers
Soccer players from California